The 1969–70 season was Liverpool Football Club's 78th season in existence and their eighth consecutive season in the First Division. This was a disappointing season, as the team finished fifth in the league after a promising start to the season while city rivals Everton won the championship title. It was to be a season of transition with so many of the players who were part of the 1960s side being replaced after being knocked out of the FA Cup by Second Division Watford. It was also a season in which they were knocked out in the early rounds of the League Cup and Fairs Cup.

One player who gave so much great service Roger Hunt, a 1966 World Cup winner left the club after 286 goals in all competitions in December 1969 to join Bolton Wanderers.

Squad

Goalkeepers
  Ray Clemence
  Tommy Lawrence
  Grahame Lloyd

Defenders
  Steve Arnold
  Gerry Byrne
  Chris Lawler
  Larry Lloyd
  John McLaughlin
  Ian Ross
  Tommy Smith
  Geoff Strong
  Peter Wall
  Ron Yeats

Midfielders
  Ian Callaghan
  Brian Hall
  Emlyn Hughes
  Alec Lindsay
  Doug Livermore
  Ian St. John
  Peter Thompson

Attackers
  Phil Boersma
  Alun Evans
  Roy Evans
  Bobby Graham
  Roger Hunt
  Steve Peplow

League table

Results

First Division

Football League Cup

FA Cup

Inter-Cities Fairs Cup

References
 LFC History.net – 1969–70 season
 Liverweb - 1969-70 Season

Liverpool F.C. seasons
Liverpool